Laksa is a spicy noodle dish popular in Southeast Asia. Laksa consists of various types of noodles, most commonly thick rice noodles, with toppings such as chicken, prawn or fish. Most variations of laksa are prepared with a rich and spicy coconut soup or a broth seasoned with sour  (tamarind or ).

Originating from Peranakan cuisine, laksa recipes are commonly served in Singapore, Indonesia, and Malaysia.

Origin
Laksa is one of the most popular dishes of Peranakan origin, with a diverse variety of ingredients and preparation processes that vary greatly by region. Because laksa has different varieties across the region, it is difficult to pinpoint the exact origin of the dish. Nevertheless, numbers of laksa recipes has been developed along the trade channels of Southeast Asia—where the ports of Singapore, Penang, Medan, Malacca, Palembang, and Batavia (now Jakarta) are the major stops along the historic spice route. The intensive trade links among these port cities enables exchanges of ideas to take place, including sharing recipes.

There are various theories about the origins of laksa. One theory is that the word laksa is theorised to come from an ancient Persian word for "noodles". According to Denys Lombard in the book  (The Javanese Crossroads: Towards a Global History, 2005), one of the earliest record of the word laksa to describe noodles was found in the Javanese Biluluk inscription dated from 1391 of Majapahit era that mentions the word hanglaksa. Hanglaksa in Kawi means "vermicelli maker". In Sanskrit, laksa means "one hundred thousand", referring to numerous strands of the vermicelli. The term laksa or lakhshah is also believed to have come from Persian or Hindi which refer to a kind of vermicelli.

Another theory about the dish's origins goes back to the 15th century Ming Chinese naval expeditions led by Zheng He, whose armada navigated Maritime Southeast Asia. Overseas Chinese migrants had settled in various parts of Maritime Southeast Asia, long before Zheng He's expedition. However, it was after this that the number of Chinese migrants and traders significantly increased. These Chinese men intermarried into the local populations, and together they formed mixed-race communities called the Peranakans or Straits Chinese. In Malaysia, the earliest variant of laksa is believed to have been introduced by the Peranakan Chinese in Malacca. The name laksa is derived from the word spicy and grainy or sandy in the Min Chinese dialect, which denotes the spicy taste and the grainy texture (either from grinding onion, granules of fish or meat, or cooked coconut milk) of laksa, since the Peranakan Malay is a creole language that is heavily influenced by a dialect of Hokkien. 

In Singapore, the dish is believed to have been created after interaction between the Peranakans with the local Singaporean Malays.

In Indonesia, the dish is believed to have been born from the mixing of the cultures and cooking practices of local people and Chinese immigrants. Historians believe laksa is a dish that was born from actual intermarriage. In early coastal pecinan (Chinese settlement) in maritime Southeast Asia, it was only Chinese men that ventured abroad out from China to trade. When settling down in the new town, these Chinese traders and sailors set out to find local wives, and these women began incorporating local spices and coconut milk into Chinese noodle soup served to their husbands. This creates the hybrid Chinese-local (Malay or Javanese) culture called Peranakan culture. As Peranakan Chinese communities have blended their ancestors' culture with local culture, Peranakan communities in different places now demonstrate diversity according to the local flavour.

Ingredients
A wide variety of laksa exists in Southeast Asia, with regional and vendor-specific differences. Laksa can be broadly categorized by its two main ingredients: noodles and soup. Most preparations of laksa are garnished with herbs. Two of the most widely used herbs are mint and Vietnamese coriander, known in Malay as daun kesum or by its colloquial name daun laksa "laksa leaf". Another popular garnish used for many laksa recipes is the unopened flower bud of the torch ginger, usually sliced or shredded.

Noodles

Thick rice noodles, also known as "laksa noodles" are most commonly used, although thin rice vermicelli ( "bee hoon") are also common. Some laksa variants might use fresh rice noodles handmade from scratch, other types of noodles; Johor laksa for example uses wheat-based spaghetti, while Kelantanese laksam is served with wide strips of rice noodle rolls similar in texture to shahe fen.

Soup
The type of Laksa is generally based upon the soup base employed in its recipe; either rich and savoury coconut milk, fresh and sour asam (tamarind, tamarind slice), or a combination of those two.

Laksa with a rich and strongly spiced coconut gravy is typically described in Malaysia and Singapore as Laksa Lemak or Nyonya Laksa. Lemak is a Malay culinary description that specifically refers to the presence of coconut milk which adds a distinctive richness to a dish, whereas Nyonya alludes to the dish's Peranakan origins and the role of women in Peranakan cuisine. "Laksa" is also an alternate name used for curry mee, a similar coconut soup noodle dish widely popular within the region which is sometimes known as curry laksa. The most common toppings for the various versions of coconut soup laksa include eggs, deep-fried tofu, beansprouts, and herbs, with a spoonful of sambal chilli paste on the side as a relish.

The Malay word asam refers to any ingredient that makes a dish taste sour (e.g. tamarind or tamarind slice, which comes from a different tree despite its name). The main ingredients for tamarind-based laksa typically include shredded fish, normally mackerel (ikan kembung), and finely sliced vegetables including cucumber, onions, red chillies, pineapple, mint leaves, laksa leaves, and shredded torch ginger flower. Preparations for tamarind-based laksa usually produce tangy, spicy, sour flavours. This type of Laksa is normally served with either thick rice noodles ("laksa") or thin rice noodles ("mee hoon") and topped off with otak udang or hae ko (蝦膏), a thick sweet shrimp paste.

In Indonesia, most laksa variants are coconut milk-based soups. Common spices include turmeric, coriander, candlenut, lemongrass, garlic, shallot, and pepper cooked in coconut milk. Widely available daun kemangi (lemon basil leaf) is commonly used instead of daun kesum commonly used in Malaysia and Singapore. Thin rice vermicelli ("bee hoon") is most commonly used, instead of thick rice noodle ("laksa"). Some recipes might even add slices of ketupat or lontong rice cake.

Regional variations

Singapore

 Katong Laksa, from the Singaporean residential neighbourhood of Katong, is a variant of Singapore-style Laksa Lemak or Singapore Laksa. The noodles in Katong Laksa are normally cut into smaller pieces so that the entire dish can be eaten with a spoon alone, without chopsticks or a fork. Another hallmark feature of this laksa is the gravy thickened not just with coconut milk but ground dried shrimp, which gives the soup its characteristic "sandy" texture. 
 Siglap Laksa from the neighbourhood of Kampung Siglap resembles Johor laksa but it is eaten with laksa noodles instead of spaghetti. The laksa is accompanied by cucumber, bean sprouts, laksa leaves and a dollop of sambal.

Indonesia

 Banjar Laksa is a laksa variant from Indonesian city of Banjarmasin that has snakehead  as one of its ingredients. Similar to Palembang Lakso, instead of rice noodle or vermicelli, Banjar Laksa uses steamed noodle-like balls, made from rice flour paste, served in a thick yellowish soup made from coconut milk, ground spices, and snakehead fish broth. Sprinkles of fried shallots and hard-boiled duck egg might also be added.
 Bogor Laksa is perhaps the most famous laksa variant in Indonesia from Bogor, West Java. The thick yellowish coconut milk-based soup is a mixture of shallot, garlic, candlenut, turmeric, coriander, lemongrass and salt.
 Betawi Laksa is a laksa variant from Jakarta, Indonesia, is similar to Bogor Laksa. However, Betawi Laksa is accompanied with basil leaves, chives, rice vermicelli, and perkedel. The thick yellowish coconut milk based soup contains ground (dried shrimp) to give it unique taste.
 Cibinong Laksa from Cibinong, a town between Bogor and Jakarta is similar to Bogor Laksa, however no oncom is added. The soup is a mixture of spices in coconut milk and it is served with bean sprout, rice vermicelli, hard-boiled eggs, cooked shredded chicken, fried shallots, and Indonesian lemon-basil leaves.
 Lakse Kuah is a specialty of Indonesian island of Natuna, is similar to Terengganu Laksa Kuah Merah. The dish consists of noodles made of sago and mashed  flesh and served in spicy coconut milk gravy made of the spice mixture.
 Laksa Tambelan from the Indonesian islands of Tambelan uses flaked sauteed  instead of fresh fish.
 Laksa Tangerang is a laksa variant from Tangerang, Indonesia. The main ingredients of Tangerang Laksa are chicken stock, mung beans, potatoes and chives. Tangerang Laksa consists of handmade noodles from the flour of boiled white rice and a thick yellow gravy similar to Bogor Laksa. Additionally, grated coconut and green beans are also added to give a sweet taste effect. Tangerang Laksa is valued for a balanced consistency of its coconut milk soup, which is not too thick or too watery.
 Palembang Laksan is a specialty of Indonesian city of Palembang. It consists of sliced fishcake that is served in coconut milk-shrimp broth based soup, sprinkled with fried shallots.
 Palembang Celimpungan is also a specialty of Palembang. The dish consists of a gravy similar to Laksan with a ball or oval-shaped fishcakes.
 Palembang Burgo is a laksa variant from Palembang. Burgo itself refers to its filling, made from rice flour and sago flour that is processed to resemble a thin omelette. The broth is pale white, made from coconut milk and various spices. It is usually accompanied with fish sauce, boiled eggs, and fried onions.
 Palembang Lakso is a laksa variant from Palembang. Unlike Laksan, Lakso consists of noodle-like steamed sago paste but served in Burgo-like coconut milk soup with only an addition of turmeric and sprinkled with fried shallots.

Malaysia

 Penang Laksa, also known as Asam Laksa, a specialty of the Malaysian island of Penang. The soup is made with mackerel and its main distinguishing feature is the asam or tamarind which gives the soup a sour and appetizing taste. The fish is poached and then flaked. Other ingredients that give Penang Laksa its distinctive flavour include mint, pineapple slices and otak udang. 
 Kedah Laksa is similar to Penang Laksa. The soup is usually made with eel instead of mackerel and quite differs, by the use of asam Gelugur instead of asam Jawa that is commonly used in Penang Laksa. As the main rice-producing state in Malaysia, Kedah Laksa uses rice flour to make laksa noodles. Sliced boiled eggs are usually added to the dish.
 Laksa Ikan Sekoq has the same base as Kedah Laksa but is served with a whole fish instead of chunks of fish meat.
 Teluk Kechai Laksa has the same base as Kedah Laksa but is served with a dollop of coconut sambal.
 Perlis Laksa is very similar to Kedah Laksa. Perlis Laksa gravy is quite concentrated because each ingredient such as mackerel, selayang fish, touch ginger and laksa leaf are blended together. The quantity of fish used is also more than laksa in other states. The broth is brighter and not reddish (i.e. chilli red) like Kedah Laksa.
 Ipoh Laksa, a specialty of the Malaysian city of Ipoh, is similar to Penang Laksa but has a sourer rather than sweet taste, and contains prawn paste. The garnishes used in Ipoh Laksa can differ slightly from those used in Penang Laksa.
 Kuala Kangsar Laksa, also known as Perak Laksa, consists of handmade wheat noodles and light broth. The soup is rather lighter than the Penang laksa and Kedah Laksa and very different from Ipoh Laksa especially in terms of presentation, taste, and smell.
 Sarang Burung Laksa has the same base as Kuala Kangsar Laksa but served with a 'nest' made from fried eggs placed on top of laksa.
 Pangkor Mee Laksa, a specialty of the Malaysian island of Pangkor and the surrounding mainland area of Perak. It consists of specialty-made white noodle that is topped with clear seafood-based soup of either fish, crab, squid or shrimp that was boiled with dried tamarind apples and salt. Sambal and sautéed vegetables such as long beans and carrots are also added to the laksa. The dish is a must-have during festive seasons.
Curry Laksa in Selangor and Kuala Lumpur, or the Klang Valley region, includes deep-fried tofu, cockles, long beans and mint as signature ingredients. It is typically served with yellow alkalised egg noodles ("mee") and/or rice vermicelli ("bee hoon"). 
 Sarawak Laksa comes from the Malaysian state of Sarawak. Its uniqueness lies in the spices mixes that are not found in laksa dishes in other states. In addition to those spices, the basic ingredients of Sarawak Laksa are rice vermicelli, chicken, fried tofu, omelette, bean sprouts, black mushrooms, shrimp, boiled eggs and musk. The broth is made from a mixture of sambal belacan, coconut milk, tamarind juice, garlic, galangal and lemongrass. Famous celebrity chef Anthony Bourdain named Sarawak Laksa as ‘Breakfast of the Gods’.
 Laksam, also known in Thailand as Lasae, is made with thick flat white rice flour noodles served with a rich, full-bodied white gravy of boiled fish and coconut milk. A specialty of the northeastern Malaysian states of Kelantan and Terengganu, Laksam is traditionally eaten with hands rather than with utensils due to the gravy's thick consistency.
 Siamese Laksa is similar to Penang Laksa with basically the same ingredient but more creamy and less tangy soup due to the addition of coconut milk and different varieties of herbs. Siamese Laksa like most other Curry Laksa, its spice paste need to be sauteed to bring out its fragrance, a step that does not exists while preparing Penang Laksa.
 Johor laksa from Johor state in southern Malaysia resembles Penang Laksa but differed greatly because it is eaten with spaghetti and the broth are made of grilled wolf herring (parang), concentrated coconut milk, onion and spices. The uniqueness of Johor Laksa lies in the use of spaghetti and the concentration of its gravy. Johor Laksa is usually served during the festive season and special occasions. Once upon a time, the people of Johor used their hands to eat this dish because it was said to be tastier. 
 Kelantan Laksa, from Kelantan state in northeastern Malaysia, is similar to Laksam, but instead of the thick Laksam noodles, Kelantan Laksa uses the same laksa noodles as Penang Laksa. It is served with ulam, belacan and a pinch of salt, and slightly sweeter as it contains palm sugar.
 Terengganu Laksa Kuah Putih is the easiest laksa recipe that is famous among people from the Malaysian state of Terengganu. Laksa Kuah Putih gets its name from the coconut milk's thick white creamy gravy. The main ingredient of Laksa Kuah Putih is mackerel that are boiled and minced. The gravy is made by mixing coconut milk with hot water and usually without cooking it. The broth then mixed with black pepper, onion and minced fish and served by adding ulam (raw vegetables) and blended chilli on the side.
 Terengganu Laksa Kuah Merah is similar to Johor Laksa. The gravy is prepared with spices and resembles Johor Laksa gravy. Laksa Kuah Merah is also served with laksa noodles and ulam on the side, similar to Laksa Kuah Putih.
 Pahang Laksa from the Malaysian state of Pahang is similar to Laksa Terengganu Kuah Merah but with the uses of salted fish, coriander, fennel, cumin instead of the complex spice mix uses in Laksa Terengganu Kuah Merah.
 Island Laksa Kuah Lemak, a specialty of the islands off the east coast of Johor, Malaysia, and the surrounding mainland area. The soup resembles Laksa Terengganu Kuah Putih but with the use of smoked fish instead of fresh fish.
 Island Laksa Kuah Kari, a specialty of the islands off the east coast of Johor, Malaysia, and the surrounding mainland area. The soup resembles Laksa Terengganu Kuah Merah but with the use of smoked fish instead of fresh fish.
 Kerabu Laksa is a salad dish that uses the elements of laksa such as Torch ginger, cucumber, mint, pineapple, onions, and chillies. The recipe has its origin in the Peranakan community in Terengganu.
 Fried Laksa is a modern adaptation of soupy laksa. The laksa noodles is fried with laksa gravy, similar to mee goreng and bihun goreng.

Summary table

Popularity
Several laksa variants have gained popularity in Malaysia, Singapore, and Indonesia; and subsequently international recognition. In July 2011, CNN Travel ranked Penang Asam Laksa seventh out of the 50 most delicious foods in the world. A later online poll by 35,000 participants published by CNN in September 2011 ranked it at number 26th. Singaporean-style Laksa on the other hand ranked on CNN "World's 50 best foods" at number 44th. In 2018, the Kuala Lumpur variant has been named the second-best food experience in the world on Lonely Planet's Ultimate Eat list.

In Indonesia, laksa is a traditional comfort food; the spicy warm noodle soup is much appreciated during cold rainy days. However, its popularity is somewhat overshadowed by soto, a similar hearty warm soup dish, which is often consumed with rice instead of noodles. In modern households, it is common practice to mix and match the recipes of laksas; if traditional laksa noodle is not available, Japanese udon noodles might be used instead.

Laksa is a popular dish in Australia. First appearing on the menus of eateries in cities like Adelaide, Australia during the 1970s, the coconut soup laksa variant is considered to have been normalized as one of Australia’s ‘borrowed’ foodways since the 2010s. The Darwin International Laksa Festival was first held in November 2019.

Malaysian Tourism Board controversy
In 2009, as part of a national food branding exercise, Malaysian Minister of Tourism Ng Yen Yen attempted to claim ownership for regional dishes such as Laksa, Hainanese Chicken Rice, and Bak Kut Teh, claiming that others have "hijacked their dishes". This led to discontent with its regional neighbours such as Singapore and Indonesia. Ng later clarified that she was misquoted on her intention to patent the foods, and that a study on the origins of the foods would be conducted "and an apology conveyed if it was wrongly claimed." To date, the results of the study have never been made public.

See also

 Mie Aceh, spicy noodle dish from Aceh
 Mie celor, savoury noodle dish from Palembang
 Soto mie, an Indonesian noodle soup dish
 Mohinga, a Burmese fish noodle soup
 Ohn no khao swè, Burmese version of coconut chicken noodle soup
 Khao soi, a northern Thai noodle dish
 Khow suey, a noodle dish originally from the Shan state in Burma
 Khao poon, a dish in Laos also known as Lao laksa
 Rice noodles

References

External links

 Article on Penang Laksa from Tourism Penang
 Article on Sarawak Laksa
 Article on Sarawak Laksa in Kuala Lumpur
 Best Laksa recommended by local chefs in Singapore

Recipes
 Laksa recipes from BBC
 Laksa recipe from the Australian Broadcasting Corporation
 Gluten Free Chicken Laksa Recipe

Malay cuisine
Street food
Foods containing coconut
National dishes
Noodle soups
Indonesian noodle dishes
Malaysian noodle dishes
Singaporean noodle dishes
Spicy foods
Culture of the Northern Territory